FAI may refer to:

Health and medicine 
 Feel status minus Actual status Inconsistency
 Femoroacetabular impingement
 Food Allergy Initiative, an American food allergen research organization
 Free    androgen       index

People 
 Collins Fai (born 1992), Cameroonian footballer
 George Fai (born 1996), Australian rugby league footballer
 Sonny Fai (1988–2009), New Zealand rugby league player

Politics 
 Broad Left Front (Peru), a political coalition in Peru
 Federación Anarquista Ibérica, the Iberian Anarchist Federation
 Informal Anarchist Federation, an insurrectionary anarchist organization
 Italian Anarchist Federation

Sport 
 Fédération Aéronautique Internationale, the world governing body for air sports
 Football Association of Ireland, the governing body for association football in the Republic of Ireland
 Futsal Association of India

Technology
Friendly artificial intelligence
First article inspection
Fully Automatic Installation

Other uses 
 FAI armoured car, a Soviet military vehicle of the early 1930s
 Fai D. Flowright, a fictional character from Tsubasa: Reservoir Chronicle
 FAI Films, a defunct Australian film production company
 FAI Insurance, former Australian insurance company
 FAI rent-a-jet, a German airline
 Fairbanks International Airport, in Alaska, United States
 Faiwol language, spoken in Papua New Guinea
 Fatal accident inquiry, in Scotland
 Festival de Afrobeat Independiente, an afrobeat festival in Buenos Aires
 Fédération Aéronautique Internationale, the world governing body for air sports; it also stewards definitions regarding human spaceflight
 Financial Access Initiative, an American research consortium
 First article inspection
 Fondo per l'Ambiente Italiano, the Italian National Trust, an Italian environmental organization
 Forschungs- und Arbeitsgemeinschaft Irland e.V., a German society for Irish philately
 Fai, a character in the anime series Endro!